The Alberta Classic was a golf tournament on the Nationwide Tour from 2003 to 2005. It was played in the Calgary, Alberta, Canada area. In 2003, it was played at The Links of Glen Eagles in Cochrane. In 2004 and 2005, it was played at the Redwood Meadows Golf and Country Club near Bragg Creek.

Tom Carter won the inaugural event in 2003, and because it was his third Nationwide Tour win of the season, he earned a promotion to the PGA Tour. Canadian David Hearn won the 2004 event. Peter Tomasulo won the third and final event in 2005.

The purse each year was US$450,000, with $81,000 going to the winner.

Winners

Carter received an immediate promotion to the PGA Tour due to it being his third win of the season.

References

External links
2005 Alberta Classic preview

Former Korn Ferry Tour events
Golf tournaments in Alberta
Sport in Calgary
Recurring sporting events established in 2003
Recurring sporting events disestablished in 2005
2003 establishments in Alberta
2005 disestablishments in Alberta